Mohanad Fallatah (born 2 February 1996) is a Saudi Arabian professional footballer who plays as a midfielder for Al-Shoulla.

Career
Fallatah started his career at the youth team of Al-Hilal in 2017. He signed a half-year contract with Al-Fayha on loan from Al-Hilal on 22 January 2019. He left Al-Hilal and joined the Pro League side Al-Fayha on June 13, 2019. On 21 October 2020, he joined Damac. On 10 September 2021, he joined Al-Adalah. On 16 January 2022, Fallatah joined Al-Shoulla.

References

External links 
 

1996 births
Living people
Saudi Arabian footballers
Al Hilal SFC players
Al-Fayha FC players
Damac FC players
Al-Adalah FC players
Al-Shoulla FC players
Saudi Professional League players
Saudi First Division League players
Association football midfielders